Westerlund 1 W26 (commonly abbreviated to W26) or Westerlund 1 BKS AS is a red supergiant within the outskirts of the Westerlund 1 super star cluster. It is one of the largest known stars and the most luminous supergiant stars discovered so far with its radius and luminosity calculated to be in excess of a thousand times the radius of the Sun and over 200,000 times its luminosity. If placed at the center of the Solar System, its photosphere would engulf the orbit of Jupiter.

Discovery

Westerlund 1 was discovered by Bengt Westerlund in 1961 during an infrared survey in the Zone of Avoidance of the sky, and described as "a heavily reddened cluster in Ara".  The spectral types of the component stars could not be determined at the time except for the brightest star which was tentatively considered type M.

In 1969, Borgman, Kornneef, and Slingerland conducted a photometric survey of the cluster and assigned letters to the stars they measured.  This star, identified as a strong radio source, was given the letter "A".  This leads to the designation Westerlund-1 BKS A as used by Simbad, although the cluster was not known as Westerlund 1 at that time.  At the time it was referred to as Ara A, with another strong radio source in the cluster called Ara C. Its brightness in the radio spectrum makes it one of the rare "radio stars".  Westerlund made spectroscopic observations of the cluster, still not known as Westerlund 1, published in 1987 and numbered the stars, giving the number 26 and the spectral type M2I. Westerlund also discovered another notable red supergiant, WOH G64, found in the Large Magellanic Cloud in the constellation Dorado.

Modern terminology stems from 1998 when the cluster was referred to as Westerlund 1 (Wd1), with a paper describing Ara A as star 26 and Ara C as star 9.

Physical characteristics

W26 is classified as a luminous cool supergiant. It occupies the upper right corner of the Hertzsprung–Russell diagram. The cool temperature means it emits a significant part of its energy in the infrared spectrum. It also shows huge mass loss of atmospheric material, suggesting that it may further evolve into a hotter supergiant. W26 has been observed to change its spectral class (and thus its temperature) during several periods, but it has not been seen to change its luminosity.

The star is almost obscured at visible wavelengths by extinction of around 13 magnitudes due to interstellar dust, hence it has been studied extensively in the longer infrared to radio wavelengths, which made it easier to study. Its spectral type identifies it a red star with a high luminosity. The bolometric luminosity of W26 has been calculated from its K-band infrared brightness to be between 320,000 and 380,000 times higher than the sun's, depending on the spectral type between M2 and M5.  These luminosities imply a radius between 1,530 and 1,580 times the Sun's radius based on effective temperatures of 3,450 and 3,660 K for spectral types M5 and M2 respectively. These parameters make W26 one of the most luminous red supergiants and are similar to those estimated for another notable red supergiant star, VY Canis Majoris. 

An earlier calculation of the luminosity and the temperature by fitting the spectral energy distribution and based on the spectrum by using DUSTY model gave a far higher luminosity near , considerably more luminous than expected for a red supergiant.

Surroundings
In October 2013, astronomers using the European Southern Observatory's Very Large Survey Telescope (VST) discovered that W26 is surrounded by a glowing cloud of ionized hydrogen. This is the first ionized nebula to have been discovered around a red supergiant star through its optical emission lines, and follows the discovery of an ionized nebula around NML Cyg in 1982. The nebula extends 1.30 parsecs from the star. The nebulae of both Westerlund 1 W20 and W26 are extended outward from the cluster core and most bright at inward direction, indicating the outward cluster wind. A later study analyzed the ejecta surrounding some of Westerlund 1's stars; the study determined the mass of W26's ejecta to be , with an uncertainty of ± .

See also 
 Westerlund 1 W237
 Westerlund 1 W75

Notes

References

Further reading
 

Ara (constellation)
Astronomical objects discovered in 1961
J16470540-4550367
M-type supergiants